The 1984–85 Philadelphia Flyers season was the Philadelphia Flyers' 18th season in the National Hockey League (NHL). The Flyers reached the Stanley Cup Finals but lost in five games to the Edmonton Oilers.

Off-season
Bobby Clarke's first move as general manager was hiring Mike Keenan as head coach. Second-year player Dave Poulin was named team captain.

Regular season
On October 18 they tied a franchise record for most goals in one game, after a 13–2 rout of the Vancouver Canucks at the Spectrum. They recorded another 10-plus goal contest on March 10 against Pittsburgh, crushing the Penguins 11–4. In addition, the team snapped the Edmonton Oilers' then NHL record 12–0–3 unbeaten streak to start the year with a 7–5 win on November 11. Four days later, they paid tribute to the recently retired Bobby Clarke on Bobby Clarke Night with a 6–1 win over the Hartford Whalers.

Although the club got off to a hot 16–4–4 start, they faltered in December, losing four straight games and five of six prior to Christmas. With the team's slate of games thin throughout January, the Washington Capitals surged to the top of the Patrick Division although the Flyers kept winning consistently.

After trailing the division-leading Capitals by 11 points in early February, the Flyers clinched the division title on March 28 and finished 12 points ahead of Washington, reeling off an incredible 24–4–0 record after February 9. The game that kicked off the stretch, on February 9 at the Capital Centre, saw Tim Kerr score four goals but Brian Propp won it, 5-4, with two seconds remaining in regulation. The club set a franchise record with 11 straight wins from March 5–24.

One season before the Presidents' Trophy was created to reward the NHL club with the most points, the Flyers finished the season with 113, four ahead of eventual Cup champion Edmonton. They also recorded their second-highest single-season goal total (tied with 1975–76, and two fewer than the previous season) and allowed the third-fewest goals behind Washington and Buffalo.

Twice during the season two players recorded hat tricks in the same game. Propp and Ilkka Sinisalo turned the trick in the Vancouver rout, while Poulin and Kerr teamed up for six goals in a wild 9–6 win over Washington on March 7.

Goaltender Pelle Lindbergh, who led the league with 40 wins, won the Vezina Trophy.

Season standings

Playoffs
The Flyers rolled through the playoffs by sweeping the New York Rangers in three games, defeating the New York Islanders in five, and beating the Quebec Nordiques in six to return to the Stanley Cup Finals. Though they defeated the defending champion Edmonton Oilers in Game 1 by a score of 4–1 at home, Edmonton won the next four games and the series.

Schedule and results

Regular season

|- style="background:#ffc;"
| 1 || October 11 || Washington Capitals || 2–2 OT || 0–0–1 || 1 || 
|- style="background:#cfc;"
| 2 || October 13 || @ Washington Capitals || 4–2 || 1–0–1 || 3 || 
|- style="background:#fcf;"
| 3 || October 15 || @ Montreal Canadiens || 2–5 || 1–1–1 || 3 || 
|- style="background:#cfc;"
| 4 || October 18 || Vancouver Canucks || 13–2 || 2–1–1 || 5 || 
|- style="background:#fcf;"
| 5 || October 20 || @ Pittsburgh Penguins || 1–3 || 2–2–1 || 5 || 
|- style="background:#cfc;"
| 6 || October 21 || Pittsburgh Penguins || 4–2 || 3–2–1 || 7 || 
|- style="background:#cfc;"
| 7 || October 23 || @ Minnesota North Stars || 7–2 || 4–2–1 || 9 || 
|- style="background:#cfc;"
| 8 || October 25 || St. Louis Blues || 7–2 || 5–2–1 || 11 || 
|- style="background:#cfc;"
| 9 || October 27 || @ New Jersey Devils || 4–2 || 6–2–1 || 12 || 
|- style="background:#ffc;"
| 10 || October 31 || @ Buffalo Sabres || 3–3 OT || 6–2–2 || 14 || 
|-

|- style="background:#fcf;"
| 11 || November 1 || Winnipeg Jets || 4–7 || 6–3–2 || 14 || 
|- style="background:#cfc;"
| 12 || November 3 || Minnesota North Stars || 5–1 || 7–3–2 || 16 || 
|- style="background:#cfc;"
| 13 || November 9 || St. Louis Blues || 6–0 || 8–3–2 || 18 || 
|- style="background:#cfc;"
| 14 || November 11 || Edmonton Oilers || 7–5 || 9–3–2 || 20 || 
|- style="background:#cfc;"
| 15 || November 15 || Hartford Whalers || 6–1 || 10–3–2 || 22 || 
|- style="background:#cfc;"
| 16 || November 17 || @ Boston Bruins || 5–3 || 11–3–2 || 24 || 
|- style="background:#ffc;"
| 17 || November 18 || New York Islanders || 3–3 OT || 11–3–3 || 25 || 
|- style="background:#cfc;"
| 18 || November 21 || Boston Bruins || 4–3 || 12–3–3 || 27 || 
|- style="background:#cfc;"
| 19 || November 23 || @ Buffalo Sabres || 4–2 || 13–3–3 || 29 || 
|- style="background:#ffc;"
| 20 || November 24 || @ Hartford Whalers || 4–4 OT || 13–3–4 || 30 || 
|- style="background:#cfc;"
| 21 || November 27 || Chicago Black Hawks || 4–2 || 14–3–4 || 32 || 
|- style="background:#fcf;"
| 22 || November 29 || New Jersey Devils || 1–2 || 14–4–4 || 32 || 
|-

|- style="background:#cfc;"
| 23 || December 1 || Pittsburgh Penguins || 3–1 || 15–4–4 || 34 || 
|- style="background:#cfc;"
| 24 || December 3 || @ New York Rangers || 6–2 || 16–4–4 || 36 || 
|- style="background:#ffc;"
| 25 || December 6 || Quebec Nordiques || 1–1 OT || 16–4–5 || 37 || 
|- style="background:#cfc;"
| 26 || December 8 || New York Rangers || 4–2 || 17–4–5 || 39 || 
|- style="background:#fcf;"
| 27 || December 11 || @ Winnipeg Jets || 4–5 OT || 17–5–5 || 39 || 
|- style="background:#fcf;"
| 28 || December 12 || @ Toronto Maple Leafs || 3–6 || 17–6–5 || 39 || 
|- style="background:#fcf;"
| 29 || December 15 || @ New York Islanders || 2–6 || 17–7–5 || 39 || 
|- style="background:#fcf;"
| 30 || December 16 || Montreal Canadiens || 2–3 || 17–8–5 || 39 || 
|- style="background:#cfc;"
| 31 || December 20 || New Jersey Devils || 8–4 || 18–8–5 || 41 || 
|- style="background:#fcf;"
| 32 || December 21 || @ Pittsburgh Penguins || 2–4 || 18–9–5 || 41 || 
|- style="background:#cfc;"
| 33 || December 23 || Washington Capitals || 7–4 || 19–9–5 || 43 || 
|- style="background:#fcf;"
| 34 || December 26 || @ Washington Capitals || 0–6 || 19–10–5 || 43 || 
|- style="background:#cfc;"
| 35 || December 28 || @ Vancouver Canucks || 7–4 || 20–10–5 || 45 || 
|- style="background:#cfc;"
| 36 || December 30 || @ Los Angeles Kings || 3–2 || 21–10–5 || 47 || 
|-

|- style="background:#cfc;"
| 37 || January 2 || @ Edmonton Oilers || 5–2 || 22–10–5 || 49 || 
|- style="background:#fcf;"
| 38 || January 3 || @ Calgary Flames || 3–4 || 22–11–5 || 49 || 
|- style="background:#cfc;"
| 39 || January 5 || @ St. Louis Blues || 6–3 || 23–11–5 || 51 || 
|- style="background:#cfc;"
| 40 || January 8 || Vancouver Canucks || 5–3 || 24–11–5 || 53 || 
|- style="background:#cfc;"
| 41 || January 10 || Chicago Black Hawks || 6–1 || 25–11–5 || 55 || 
|- style="background:#fcf;"
| 42 || January 12 || @ New York Islanders || 3–5 || 25–12–5 || 55 || 
|- style="background:#cfc;"
| 43 || January 13 || Calgary Flames || 7–1 || 26–12–5 || 57 || 
|- style="background:#ffc;"
| 44 || January 16 || @ Detroit Red Wings || 1–1 OT || 26–12–6 || 58 || 
|- style="background:#cfc;"
| 45 || January 17 || Detroit Red Wings || 7–5 || 27–12–6 || 60 || 
|- style="background:#cfc;"
| 46 || January 19 || @ Minnesota North Stars || 4–1 || 28–12–6 || 62 || 
|- style="background:#fcf;"
| 47 || January 23 || @ Los Angeles Kings || 3–6 || 28–13–6 || 62 || 
|- style="background:#fcf;"
| 48 || January 27 || @ Winnipeg Jets || 2–6 || 28–14–6 || 62 || 
|- style="background:#cfc;"
| 49 || January 31 || New Jersey Devils || 3–1 || 29–14–6 || 64 || 
|-

|- style="background:#fcf;"
| 50 || February 2 || Buffalo Sabres || 3–6 || 29–15–6 || 64 || 
|- style="background:#fcf;"
| 51 || February 5 || @ New York Islanders || 5–7 || 29–16–6 || 64 || 
|- style="background:#ffc;"
| 52 || February 7 || Los Angeles Kings || 4–4 OT || 29–16–7 || 65 || 
|- style="background:#cfc;"
| 53 || February 9 || @ Washington Capitals || 5–4 || 30–16–7 || 67 || 
|- style="background:#cfc;"
| 54 || February 10 || New York Rangers || 3–2 || 31–16–7 || 69 || 
|- style="background:#cfc;"
| 55 || February 14 || Quebec Nordiques || 6–3 || 32–16–7 || 71 || 
|- style="background:#cfc;"
| 56 || February 16 || Edmonton Oilers || 5–4 || 33–16–7 || 73 || 
|- style="background:#cfc;"
| 57 || February 18 || Pittsburgh Penguins || 8–2 || 34–16–7 || 75 || 
|- style="background:#cfc;"
| 58 || February 21 || Toronto Maple Leafs || 4–1 || 35–16–7 || 77 || 
|- style="background:#cfc;"
| 59 || February 24 || Calgary Flames || 4–1 || 36–16–7 || 79 || 
|- style="background:#cfc;"
| 60 || February 26 || @ Hartford Whalers || 3–2 || 37–16–7 || 81 || 
|- style="background:#fcf;"
| 61 || February 28 || @ Boston Bruins || 1–6 || 37–17–7 || 81 || 
|-

|- style="background:#fcf;"
| 62 || March 2 || @ Quebec Nordiques || 2–4 || 37–18–7 || 81 || 
|- style="background:#fcf;"
| 63 || March 3 || @ New Jersey Devils || 2–5 || 37–19–7 || 81 || 
|- style="background:#cfc;"
| 64 || March 5 || @ New York Islanders || 5–4 OT || 38–19–7 || 83 || 
|- style="background:#cfc;"
| 65 || March 7 || Washington Capitals || 9–6 || 39–19–7 || 85 || 
|- style="background:#cfc;"
| 66 || March 8 || @ Washington Capitals || 4–2 || 40–19–7 || 87 || 
|- style="background:#cfc;"
| 67 || March 10 || Pittsburgh Penguins || 11–4 || 41–19–7 || 89 || 
|- style="background:#cfc;"
| 68 || March 13 || @ New York Rangers || 5–2 || 42–19–7 || 91 || 
|- style="background:#cfc;"
| 69 || March 16 || @ Toronto Maple Leafs || 6–1 || 43–19–7 || 93 || 
|- style="background:#cfc;"
| 70 || March 17 || New York Islanders || 5–3 || 44–19–7 || 95 || 
|- style="background:#cfc;"
| 71 || March 19 || @ Pittsburgh Penguins || 5–3 || 45–19–7 || 97 || 
|- style="background:#cfc;"
| 72 || March 21 || New York Rangers || 8–4 || 46–19–7 || 99 || 
|- style="background:#cfc;"
| 73 || March 23 || @ New Jersey Devils || 5–3 || 47–19–7 || 101 || 
|- style="background:#cfc;"
| 74 || March 24 || Montreal Canadiens || 4–3 || 48–19–7 || 103 || 
|- style="background:#fcf;"
| 75 || March 27 || @ Chicago Black Hawks || 2–5 || 48–20–7 || 103 || 
|- style="background:#cfc;"
| 76 || March 28 || Detroit Red Wings || 3–1 || 49–20–7 || 105 || 
|- style="background:#cfc;"
| 77 || March 30 || New York Rangers || 3–0 || 50–20–7 || 107 || 
|-

|- style="background:#cfc;"
| 78 || April 2 || @ New York Rangers || 2–1 || 51–20–7 || 109 || 
|- style="background:#cfc;"
| 79 || April 4 || New York Islanders || 3–0 || 52–20–7 || 111 || 
|- style="background:#cfc;"
| 80 || April 7 || @ New Jersey Devils || 6–1 || 53–20–7 || 113 || 
|-

|-
| Legend:

Playoffs

|- style="background:#cfc;"
| 1 || April 10 || New York Rangers || 5–4 OT || Flyers lead 1–0 || 
|- style="background:#cfc;"
| 2 || April 11 || New York Rangers || 3–1 || Flyers lead 2–0 || 
|- style="background:#cfc;"
| 3 || April 13 || @ New York Rangers || 6–5 || Flyers win 3–0 || 
|-

|- style="background:#cfc;"
| 1 || April 18 || New York Islanders || 3–0 || Flyers lead 1–0 || 
|- style="background:#cfc;"
| 2 || April 21 || New York Islanders || 5–2 || Flyers lead 2–0 || 
|- style="background:#cfc;"
| 3 || April 23 || @ New York Islanders || 5–3 || Flyers lead 3–0 || 
|- style="background:#fcf;"
| 4 || April 25 || @ New York Islanders || 2–6 || Flyers lead 3–1 || 
|- style="background:#cfc;"
| 5 || April 28 || New York Islanders || 1–0 || Flyers win 3–0 || 
|-

|- style="background:#fcf;"
| 1 || May 5 || @ Quebec Nordiques || 1–2 OT || Nordiques lead 1–0 || 
|- style="background:#cfc;"
| 2 || May 7 || @ Quebec Nordiques || 4–2 || Series tied 1–1 || 
|- style="background:#cfc;"
| 3 || May 9 || Quebec Nordiques || 4–2 || Flyers lead 2–1 || 
|- style="background:#fcf;"
| 4 || May 12 || Quebec Nordiques || 3–5 || Series tied 2–2 || 
|- style="background:#cfc;"
| 5 || May 14 || @ Quebec Nordiques || 2–1 || Flyers lead 3–2 || 
|- style="background:#cfc;"
| 6 || May 16 || Quebec Nordiques || 3–0 || Flyers win 4–2 || 
|-

|- style="background:#cfc;"
| 1 || May 21 || Edmonton Oilers || 4–1 || Flyers lead 1–0 || 
|- style="background:#fcf;"
| 2 || May 23 || Edmonton Oilers || 1–3 || Series tied 1–1 || 
|- style="background:#fcf;"
| 3 || May 25 || @ Edmonton Oilers || 3–4 || Oilers lead 2–1 || 
|- style="background:#fcf;"
| 4 || May 28 || @ Edmonton Oilers || 3–5 || Oilers lead 3–1 || 
|- style="background:#fcf;"
| 5 || May 30 || @ Edmonton Oilers || 3–8 || Oilers win 4–1 || 
|-

|-
| Legend:

Player statistics

Scoring
 Position abbreviations: C = Center; D = Defense; G = Goaltender; LW = Left Wing; RW = Right Wing
  = Joined team via a transaction (e.g., trade, waivers, signing) during the season. Stats reflect time with the Flyers only.
  = Left team via a transaction (e.g., trade, waivers, release) during the season. Stats reflect time with the Flyers only.

Goaltending

Awards and records

Awards

Records

Among the team records set during the 1984–85 regular season was tying the team record for most goals in a game (13) on October 18 against the Vancouver Canucks, a mark which was set only seven months earlier. On October 25, Tim Kerr scored the first of what would be three 4-goal games during the regular season (January 17 and February 9 being the others), tying the team record, and also set the team marks for most goals in a period (3) and the fastest three goals by one player (two minutes and twenty-seven seconds) during the game. On January 13, Brian Propp tied a team record when he scored two shorthanded goals while the three total during the game also tied a team record. Goaltender Pelle Lindbergh tied the team record for most consecutive wins (9) from March 9 to March 24. Propp’s seven shorthanded goals on the season is tied for the team record and Kerr’s five hat tricks on the season is a team record. The team set records for most wins (53, tied the following season) and fewest road ties (3, subsequently tied twice).

With their victory in game one of their division semifinal playoff series against the New York Rangers, the Flyers ended a franchise record six game playoff home losing streak that stretched from April 26, 1981 to April 7, 1984. In the series deciding 6–5 victory against the Rangers on April 13, Tim Kerr set a number of NHL and team records during the second period, scoring four goals (tied for the NHL record) in a span of an NHL playoff record eight minutes and sixteen seconds, an NHL record three of which were on the powerplay. His four points during the period and his three powerplay goals during the game is also tied for the NHL record, while the three minutes and twenty-four seconds it took him to score three goals is a team record. Peter Zezel’s three assists during the period is tied for the team record (replicated by Kerr on April 21 against the New York Islanders) and four points during the game is tied for the team rookie record. Records tied by the team as a whole include most goals (5) and powerplay goals (3) during the period, while the four powerplay goals during the game is tied for the team record.

Lindbergh won a team record six consecutive playoff wins from April 10 through April 23, tying Bernie Parent’s 1974 mark. Doug Crossman’s three powerplay goals during the playoffs is tied for the team record among defensemen.

Transactions
The Flyers were involved in the following transactions from May 20, 1984, the day after the deciding game of the 1984 Stanley Cup Finals, through May 30, 1985, the day of the deciding game of the 1985 Stanley Cup Finals.

Trades

Players acquired

Players lost

Signings

Draft picks

Philadelphia's picks at the 1984 NHL Entry Draft, which was held at the Montreal Forum in Montreal, Quebec, on June 9, 1984. The Flyers selection of Petr Rucka in the eleventh-round, 226th overall, was voided since Rucka had already been selected by the Calgary Flames in the tenth-round.

Farm teams
The Flyers were affiliated with the Hershey Bears of the AHL and the Kalamazoo Wings of the IHL.

Notes

References
General
 
 
 
Specific

Philadelphia Flyers seasons
Philadelphia
Philadelphia
Patrick Division champion seasons
Eastern Conference (NHL) championship seasons
Phil
Philadelphia
Philadelphia